Jalan Bukit Fraser 1 or Jalan Gap-Bukit Fraser, Federal Route 56, is a federal road in Fraser's Hill, both in Selangor and Pahang state, Malaysia. Unlike most federal roads in Malaysia, Jalan Bukit Fraser is a single-lane federal road, which direction was used to be reversed hourly before the newer Jalan Bukit Fraser 2 route 148 was completed in 2001 for downhill traffic. Now the road is used for uphill traffic at all times. The road is only open during daytime for safety reasons. It is maintained by the Malaysian Public Works Department (JKR) and the Fraser's Hill Development Corporation (FHDC).

Route background
The Kilometre Zero of the Federal Route 56 starts at The Gap.

History
The road was constructed by the British on 1919. In 1919, work started on the access road to the hill station from The Gap and by 1922, the hill station named Fraser's Hill was opened to visitors.

Features

Fraser's Hill border marker line between Selangor and Pahang.

At most sections, the Federal Route 56 was built under the JKR R5 road standard, allowing maximum speed limit of up to 90 km/h.

List of junctions

The entire route is located within the district of Raub, Pahang. All junctions listed are at-grade intersections unless stated otherwise.

Gallery

References

Malaysian Federal Roads